Gubakha is a town in Perm Krai, Russia, located on the Kosva River (Kama's tributary)  northeast of Perm. Population:

History
Gubakha arose in 1755 due to the discovery of iron ore in Krestovaya mountain. The village of Gubakha stood at the confluence of the Gubashka River into the Kosva River and served as a wharf for barges that transported iron ore from the upper Kosva to the Kama. In 1825 first coal was found in Gubakha on Krestovaya mountain where the first mine adit was laid. Initially coal mining was carried out in very limited extent, the coal was fused down the Kosva river to the smelting works. After the railway was built in 1879 the coal mining increased sharply.

In 1928 Gubakha was given a status of city settlement. In 1936 the first phase of the largest in the country and the first in the Urals coke producing plant - Gubakhinskiy coke plant - was started up. After repeated changes, by the middle of the 60's the suburban area of Gubakha had acquired its modern outline. On November 4, 1959, the town of Ugleuralsk was annexed to Gubakha.

Administrative and municipal status
Within the framework of administrative divisions, it is, together with two work settlements and six rural localities, incorporated as the town of krai significance of Gubakha—an administrative unit with the status equal to that of the districts. Being a municipal division, the town of krai significance of Gubakha is incorporated as Gubakha Urban Okrug.

Economy
The town's economy includes several industrial facilities producing coke, chemicals, biochemicals, toys and power.  An industrial base was built in Gubakha during World War II.  Equipment from an evacuated nitrogen fertilizer plant was moved to Gubakha.  Later, German reparations were used to increase the capital equipment in Gubakha.  The plant was officially recognized as operational in 1955.  During 1957 the plant may have been one of the first in Russia to operate a gas coke oven. In 1964 the plant began producing Methyl(ethyl)amines which are necessary for rocket fuel.

In 1993, the industrial association made up of the various chemical production facilities was reorganized into a joint stock company called Metrafrax.  51% of the company stock was sold to employees.  Several agreements to build up waste treatment, expand and update the factory, and to build apartment blocks and a brewing facility were also concluded.

The Kizel State Regional Power Plant is located in Gubakha.

Gubakha Coke has capacity to produce 1.3 million mt of metallurgical coke annually.  The plant has never produced at capacity.

Facilities
The town has a medical school and an orphanage.

References

Notes

Sources

External links
Official website of Gubakha 
Gubakha Business Directory  

Cities and towns in Perm Krai
Gubakha Urban Okrug